Tenebrio is a genus of darkling beetles. The larvae are minor pests, but they are also widely reared and sold as pet food.

Species
The genus contains the following extant species:

 Tenebrio culinaris 
 Tenebrio guineensis 
 Tenebrio giganteus 
 Tenebrio grandicollis 
 Tenebrio molitor  – yellow mealworm
 Tenebrio obscurus  – dark mealworm
 Tenebrio opacus 
 Tenebrio patrizii 
 Tenebrio punctipennis 
 Tenebrio zairensis 

Four species are known from fossils found in Germany and Canada:
 Tenebrio calculensis  - (Pleistocene, Leda Clay, Canada)
 Tenebrio effossus  - (Oligocene, Rott Formation, Germany)
 Tenebrio primigenius  - (Ypresian, Allenby Formation, Canada)
 Tenebrio senex  - (Oligocene, Rott Formation, Germany)

Gallery

References

Tenebrionidae genera
Taxa named by Carl Linnaeus
Extant Eocene first appearances
Eocene insects of North America
Oligocene animals of Europe
Pet foods